Garakolob is a rural locality (a selo) in Saniortinsky Selsoviet, Tlyaratinsky District, Republic of Dagestan, Russia. The population was 249 as of 2010.

Geography 
Garakolob is located 16 km southeast of Tlyarata (the district's administrative centre) by road. Nitilsukh is the nearest rural locality.

References 

Rural localities in Tlyaratinsky District